Sanjog is a 1972 Indian Hindi-language drama film directed by S. S. Balan. The film stars Mala Sinha, Amitabh Bachchan and Aruna Irani in the lead roles. It is a remake of the Tamil film Iru Kodugal directed by K. Balachander.

Plot 
Mohan (Amitabh Bachchan) falls in love with Asha (Mala Sinha) and they get married in temple. The marriage is not accepted by Mohan's mother and the couple gets separated. Asha is pregnant and her father Shiv Dayal (Madan Puri), realising that no man will marry Asha second time, decides to make her a collector. Mohan meanwhile had moved to South India, where he later married Seema (Aruna Irani) as he was informed through his parents that Asha died. They live a happy life with their two children and Seema's father (Nazir Hussain). Mohan works as a clerk in the collector's office. A new collector arrives at the office, and it turns out to be Asha. They tend to work together and Mansukh (Johnny Walker) with his friends spread a rumour across stating that there is an affair between Asha and Mohan. This rumour reaches Seema and she is completely disturbed. Seema discovers the secret of Mohan's affair with Asha. After much turmoil, Seema finds out that Asha and Mohan had married 10 year back before her marriage to Mohan. In this, while saving Seema when she wanted to die, Asha dies. Asha gives her eyes to Seema, whose eye-sight went in the accident in which Asha died. The ending scenes show Mohan, Seema, her father, Asha's father, and three kids (two Seema's and one Asha's) altogether paying homage to Asha.

Cast 
Mala Sinha as Asha
Amitabh Bachchan as Mohan
Aruna Irani as Seema
Madan Puri as Shiv Dayal
Nazir Hussain as Seema's Father
Johnny Walker as Mansukh
Keshto Mukherjee as Mohan's father
Ramesh Deo as Hospital Doctor

Soundtrack

Reception 
Film World wrote, "Had Balan stuck to the original Tamil version [Iru Kodugal] instead of padding the proceedings with the stuff that is supposed to spell box office in Hindi Cinema, Sanjog would have been a passable entertainer. Mukhram Sharma's screenplay is old-fashioned, trite and incoherent. The direction is missing."

References

External links 
 

1970s Hindi-language films
1972 drama films
1972 films
Films scored by R. D. Burman
Gemini Studios films
Hindi remakes of Tamil films
Hindi-language drama films
Indian drama films